Solariella cristata is a species of sea snail, a marine gastropod mollusk in the family Solariellidae.

Distribution
This species occurs in the Gulf of Mexico, the Caribbean Sea and the Lesser Antilles in depths between 155 m and 256 m.

Description 
The maximum recorded shell length is 9.1 mm, its diameter 9.45 mm

Habitat 
Minimum recorded depth is 201 m. Maximum recorded depth is 256 m.

References

 Quinn, J. F., Jr. 1992. New species of Solariella (Gastropoda: Trochidae) from the Western Atlantic Ocean. Nautilus 106: 50–54.
 Rosenberg, G., F. Moretzsohn, and E. F. García. 2009. Gastropoda (Mollusca) of the Gulf of Mexico, Pp. 579–699 in Felder, D.L. and D.K. Camp (eds.), Gulf of Mexico–Origins, Waters, and Biota. Biodiversity. Texas A&M Press, College Station, Texas.

External links

cristata
Gastropods described in 1992